The Covox Speech Thing is an external audio device attached to the computer to output digital sound. It was composed of a primitive 8-bit DAC using a resistor ladder and an analogue signal output, and plugged into the printer port of the PC.

The Speech Thing was introduced on December 18, 1987 by Covox, Inc of Eugene, Oregon, for about US$70 (US$79.95 as of 1989), but as its parts were much cheaper than the complete plug, and as its design was fairly simple, people soon started to build their own variants.
The plug was used long into the 1990s, as sound cards were still very expensive at that time. The plug was also quite popular in the demoscene.

An inherent problem of the design is that it requires very precise resistors. If normal parts are used, the values get shuffled, especially for quiet sounds, resulting in distortion. Nevertheless, the sound quality of the Covox plug is far superior compared to the PC speaker; even today, a self-built Covox plug is still an inexpensive way to give old computers sound capabilities.

Commercial products 
 Covox Speech Thing - the simplest hardware DAC, bundled with speech synthesis software, marketed originally as part of voice synthesis and recognition system.

 Disney Sound Source - a hardware system with a similar design to the Covox Speech Thing, marketed by Disney Software in early 1990s. It consisted of 3 parts: a FIFO and a DAC on PCB plugged into printer port and separate amplifier / speaker box. Its price was set to only $14 and it was supported by many games (see below). It used external power (9 volt battery) and could be turned on/off by software. Contrary to the Speech Thing the output rate is determined by the hardware (7 kHz) and the design features a 16 byte FIFO allowing for autodetection and flow control of the output. In 2015 the hardware was reverse engineered so compatible circuits can be built from easily available off the shelf components. It is also emulated by the popular DOSBox emulator.

Features 

In its simplest form, Covox received 8-bit, mono signal through the parallel port and produced analog output that could be amplified and played back on loudspeakers. Sampling rate was not fixed by hardware means, and theoretically Covox can support any sampling rate. In practice, however, parallel port speed limits make it rather hard to achieve even standard CD-quality 44100 Hz (the average 80286 system could handle sampling rate for COVOX with 12kHz, the 486SX-33 system with 44kHz). Another limiting factor compared to traditional sound cards was the need to use computationally demanding timer interrupts to play background music, since there was no direct memory access available. However, the sound quality can be increased by software through dithering, thus aliasing noise is minimized and the dynamics are increased (used in Inertia Player and FastTracker 2 as an interpolating option).

Compatibility

Games
The Covox plug couldn't directly substitute any of the popular cards of that age (AdLib, Sound Blaster, Gravis Ultrasound, etc.), but several games / platforms supported it directly. It is also usually used in tandem with a AdLib sound card as said card officially was a music card and while it could be put into a mode to handle sampled audio, it could not play sampled audio and music at the same time. Notable entries include:
 688 Attack Sub - Title Music, Sound effects
 Zorro - plays Samples on Covox
 Battle Bugs - plays Speech on Covox / requires EMS otherwise no Speech
 Star Control 2 - Sounds 
 Lemmings – had special promotional edition named Covox Lemmings, released with Covox sound cards; the game is identical to original game but contains a "Covox" level and seven more additional levels (only works with Covox Soundcards for ISA Bus).
 Pinball Fantasies.
 Most older Sierra Entertainment games, such as King's Quest and Space Quest series, could output the sound to Covox when selecting "Disney Sound Source".
 Some Games work with a software emulator called Virtual Soundblaster, such as Wolfenstein 3D, has also native Support for the Disney Soundsource.
 Others with the Tandy Emulator (TEMU) or Tandy 3 Voice Sound: Eye of the Beholder, Sid Meier's Civilization
 Duke Nukem 3D, Redneck Rampage, Shadow Warrior supports Disney Sound Source.

Music trackers
Popular DOS-based trackers used on demoscene included Covox support, for example:
 Modplay (also ModEdit, DMP, VP and other Mod players from early 1990s) (Up to 4 channel COVOX output or custom assembler routine for user device)
 Inertia Player (mono, stereo-on-1 covox, with dithering option).
 Multiplayer by DGS Italian Software Company
 Galaxy Music Player (can play MODs even on an Intel 8088)
 Scream Tracker version 2.3 direct support. Version 3.21 through virtual-soundblaster driver.
 Fast Tracker (mono, stereo, stereo-on-1 mode, with dithering).
 Impulse Tracker

Emulators
Emulators existed that allowed Covox to act as if there was another soundboard installed:
 Virtual SoundBlaster - could emulate Sound Blaster on Covox
 Covoxer - could emulate Tandy 1000/2000 music synthesizer
 TEMU - could emulate Tandy 1000/2000 music synthesizer and DSS

In reverse, the DOSBox and Fake86 emulators allow to emulate presence of Covox (as Disney Sound Source) on a machine without such physical device connected.

As of 2015 the circuit for the Disney Sound Source has been reverse engineered, so Covox plugs can be used with software requiring such hardware without the need of any additional software emulators using an additional plug that goes between the computer's LPT port and the Covox.

Operating systems
Several operating systems have a driver for Covox available for install:
 Windows 3.1x, Windows 95, Windows 98
 Linux 2.1
 MenuetOS
 CSI-DOS

A userspace program that uses direct access to the hardware can also be used on modern Linux distributions.

Modern clones
 Simple LPTsnd - 
 CVX-4 - 
 Disney Soundsource Remake - 
 Benedikts Covox Remakes (SoundJr, Covox Replica, FTL Soundadapter) - 
 ISA LPT DAC r0 (Covox Clone connected to ISA BUS) -

References

External links 

 Powering devices from PC parallel port, an article on LPT-port devices, including Covox.
 List of games that support Disney Sound Source at MobyGames.com.
 List of games that support Covox Speech Thing at MobyGames.com.
 A collection of software for Covox, including Windows driver.
  Covox Voice Master schematics and software.
  Covox Digital-Analog Converter, a comprehensive Covox history overview.
 DSS Reverse Engineering on Vogons DSS Reverse Engineering Thread

Sound cards
Computer-related introductions in 1986